Good Times is the debut and only album by the British actor and pop artist Adam Rickitt, released in 1999.

After leaving the soap opera Coronation Street, Rickitt signed a Pounds 100,000 six-album deal with music giants Polydor Records. For his first effort, he contributed to the composition of several songs, something unusual for a pop music artist, more oriented towards teenagers.

Three singles were released: The first one "I Breathe Again", the most successful, #5 in the UK charts, and silver certified by BPI, "Everything My Heart Desires" was chosen as the second, it reached #15 in UK charts, "Good Times" was announced as the third single, but instead "The Best Thing" was chosen, it reached #25 in UK.

Commercially, it did not reach the top 40 in the UK (reached number 41 on the UK Albums Chart.) and did not appear on European charts. However, it was certified platinum in Southeast Asia.

Although Rickitt had said in early interviews that he would be recording his second album in 2000, the poor chart performance and total lack of interest of the artist, led to the end of his contract and Rickitt returned to acting.

After years unavailable to the public due to the label's disinterest, the album was available for streaming in 2018.

Background and production
In 1997, Adam Rickitt began playing the role of Nick Tilsley in the ITV soap opera Coronation Street, a role that contributed to gaining fans, especially teenagers. Despite his success, Rickitt, 22, left the soap in 1999 after signing a Pounds 100,000 six-album deal with music giants Polydor.

Rickitt composed most of the songs, something that was highlighted in some media outlets, in an interview he said: "Well, I've written about half the album. And when I signed the deal, it wasn't something that people expected of me. They were assuming that I'd sit there and do what I was told. But I want to be involved as much as I can". He also commentend in an interview to the Evening Mail newspaper: "[I] worked with some top people like Todd Terry and Ray Hedges. I chose all the songs and tried to get a good mix. I wanted to create an album on which every track was a possible single. There are a couple of ballads, some pop and dance and some Backstreet Boys- tracks. No regrets. There's a seventies feel on some of the songs because I love the disco music of that era but I've tried to bring it up to date for the 90s".

Release and promotion
Before the first single was released, the singer tried to break his contract with the record company, which made a series of demands that ranged from how he should dress to the haircut he should use, such demands discouraged the singer who said he wasn't being himself. The label rejected the request, arguing that they had invested too much money in recording the album and would need a financial return. They gave the singer the option to record just one album and then release him from the contract, which he agreed to.

The album's promotion featured a substantial number of interviews, according to Rickitt: "I would get up at 5am, go to bed at midnight and spend the time in between doing interviews, saying exactly the same things. It was going through the motions 24/7 and it was so boring". The singer revealed that the popstar's life had turned out to be worse than he imagined: "I knew pop music especially was going to be pretty hollow," he says. "I wasn't going to put the world to rights. But I thought it would be great fun. You'd be out gigging all the time and going to parties. But the way pop is now it's 99 per centpromotion, 1 per cent about the product". The promotion featured a trip to Southeast Asia that contributed to the success of his singles. After the success of the album in the country, the record company rejected the idea of breaking the contract with the singer, which was broken only after a legal process.

Critical reception

Ian Hyland, from Sunday Mirror newspaper, gave the album 8/10 score and wrote that Rickitt "should be right proud of this sparky pop album which makes you forget he was ever a soap star". Andy Lee from The Northern Echo, wrote that it is a "fairly good album, full of sound dance tracks" and pointed "I Breathe Again" and "Godd Times" as the album highlights.

Some critics brande it as "disco-fluff that would only appeal to girls under 13 and gay men under 30". At the same time, speculation about his sexuality has increased considerably in the media. R.S. Murthi from Malasian New Straits Times newspaper, considered the album "lushly-arranged dance-pop that's not so much bad as utterly boring".

Commercial performance
Although the single " Everything My Heart Desires", peaked at #15 in the same week of the album release, Good Times failed to get the top 40. Despite poor performance in the UK (#41), Rickitt's official website reported that the record was certified gold in the country, although the BPI did not certify it. The album was certified platinum in Southeast Asia.

Although Rickitt had said in some interviews that he would be recording his second album, in the year 2000, the singer broke his contract with his record company in the same year, which makes Godd Times his only studio album. In his official website he said that: "It was something I wanted to do at the time but it became something I really didn't enjoy. I don't mean the touring because I didn't mind that, the fans were great. It was hard work but I don't mind working hard if it's something which inspires me. I just don't feel that way about pop music. I started finding it rather vacant and uncreative".

Track listing

Charts

References

1999 debut albums
Polydor Records albums
Adam Rickitt albums